Religion in Mali is predominantly Islam with an estimated 95 percent of the population being Muslim, with the remaining 5 percent of Malians adhere to traditional African religions such as the Dogon religion, or Christianity. Atheism and agnosticism are believed to be rare among Malians, most of whom practice their religion daily, although some are Deist.<ref name=cp>Mali country profile. Library of Congress Federal Research Division (January 2005). This article incorporates text from this source, which is in the public domain.</ref>

Muslims are mostly Sunni belonging to Maliki school of jurisprudence influenced with Sufism. Ahmadiyya and Shia minorities are also present.

 Islam 

According to the 2005 U.S. Department of State’s annual report on religious freedom, Islam as traditionally practiced in Mali was characterized as moderate, tolerant, and adapted to local conditions. Women were allowed to participate in social economical and political activities and generally do not wear veils, except for some Tuareg women. According to the 2012 Pew Forum study The World’s Muslims: Unity and Diversity'', 94% of Muslims in Mali believe that religion is very important in their lives and 71% believe there is "only one true way to understand Islam’s teachings" (24% believing that multiple interpretations of Islam are possible).

Christianity 

Christianity was introduced to Mali in the late 19th century by the French. In 2014, there are 275,000 Catholics in Mali, around 1.86% of the total population.

Secularism 
The constitution establishes a secular state and provides for freedom of religion, and the government largely respects this right. Relations between Muslims and practitioners of minority religious faiths are generally friendly, and foreign missionary groups (both Muslim and non-Muslim) are tolerated. Parties based on ethnic or religious lines are banned and public schools do not offer religious instruction.

Dogon religion

The Dogon religion is the traditional African religious or spiritual beliefs of the Dogon people of Mali. Dogons who practice the traditional religion of their ancestors believe in one Supreme Creator called Amma (or Ama). Amma is the omnipotent, omniscient and omnipresent Creator in Dogon religion. They also believe in ancestral spirits known as the Nommo also referred to as "Water Spirits". Veneration of the ancestors form an important aspect of their spiritual belief. Mask dances are held immediately after the death of a person and sometimes long after they have passed on to the next life.

Freedom of religion 
Prior to the Northern Mali conflict, human rights groups recorded "no recent reports of persecution, discrimination, or imprisonment on the basis of religious convictions or affiliation." However, terrorist groups attempted to institute strict Islamic law in the northern parts of the country in 2012 and Mali was listed high (#7) in the Christian persecution index published by Open Doors, which described the persecution in the north as severe. In spite of this, a 2015 study estimated some 8,000 believers in Christ from a Muslim background in the country. Several Islamic sites in Mali were destroyed or damaged by vigilante activists linked to Al Qaeda, claiming that "idol worship" characterized the sites. Given the cultural and religious importance of the sites in the city of Timbuctu (Tomboctou), eight of the shrines on the UNESCO heritage list had been fully reconstructed, and another six were in the process of reconstruction, by July 2015. However, the occupation and Sharia law were both short-lived, cut short by a French and Chadian military intervention that began in January 2013.

See also
Religion in Africa

References